Tikhonov (masculine), sometimes spelled as Tychonoff, or Tikhonova (feminine) is a Russian surname that is derived from the male given name Tikhon, the Russian form of the Greek name Τύχων (Latin form: Tycho), and literally means Tikhon's. It may refer to:

Andrey Nikolayevich Tikhonov, Russian mathematician
Alexander Tikhonov, Russian biathlon athlete
Alexei Tikhonov, Russian figure skater
Andrey Tikhonov, Russian football player and coach
, Soviet army officer and Hero of the Soviet Union
Ivan Tikhonov, Russian-born Azerbaijani gymnast
Mikhail Tikhonov, Soviet soldier and Hero of the Soviet Union
Nikita Tikhonov, suspect in Stanislav Markelov murder case
Nikolai Tikhonov, former Premier of the Soviet Union
Nikolai Tikhonov (writer), Russian writer
Nikolai Tikhonov (cosmonaut), Russian cosmonaut
, Soviet pilot and Hero of the Soviet Union
Vasily Tikhonov (rower), Soviet rower
Vasily Tikhonov (ice hockey coach), Russian ice hockey coach
, Soviet soldier and Hero of the Soviet Union
Viktor Tikhonov (politician), Ukrainian politician
, Soviet pilot and Hero of the Soviet Union
Viktor Tikhonov (born 1930), former coach for the Soviet national ice hockey team
Viktor Tikhonov (born 1988), Russian ice hockey player
Vladimir Tikhonov, Russian politician
Vladimir Tikhonov (gymnast), Soviet Olympic gymnast
Vyacheslav Tikhonov (1928-2009), Soviet actor
Anastasia Tikhonova, Russian tennis player
Katerina Tikhonova, Russian scientist and manager
Nina Tikhonova (1910-1995), Russian choreographic artist and dance instructor
Sofia Tikhonova, Russian ski jumper
Tamara Tikhonova, former Soviet Russian cross-country skier

Mathematics
Tikhonov distribution, a random variable distribution
Tikhonov regularization, a method of regularization of ill-posed problems
Tychonoff spaces, a completely regular topological spaces
Tychonoff's theorem, a result on topological spaces
Tychonoff separation axioms, in topology

Other uses
Tikhonov (rural locality), a khutor in the Republic of Adygea, Russia

Russian-language surnames